Sebastian Rivero (born November 16, 1998) is a Venezuelan professional baseball catcher in the Chicago White Sox organization. Rivero signed with the Kansas City Royals as an international free agent in 2013.

Career

Kansas City Royals
On July 10, 2015, Rivero signed with the Kansas City Royals as an international free agent. He made his professional debut with the DSL Royals in 2016, and also appeared in 38 games for the AZL Royals, accumulating a .280 average between the two clubs. In 2017, he played for the rookie ball Burlington Royals, batting .265/.288/.381 with 4 home runs and 28 RBI. He played for the Single-A Lexington Legends in 2018, hitting .258/.301/.391 with 7 home runs and 34 RBI. He split the 2019 season between the High-A Wilmington Blue Rocks and the Triple-A Omaha Storm Chasers, slashing .216/.273/.280 in 94 games between the teams.

Rivero did not play in a game in 2020 due to the cancellation of the minor league season because of the COVID-19 pandemic. Rivero was added to the Royals’ 60-man player pool for the 2020 season but did not appear for the major league club.

The Royals added Rivero to their 40-man roster after the 2020 season to protect him from being selected in the Rule 5 draft. On May 3, 2021, Rivero was promoted to the major leagues for the first time. On May 8, Rivero made his MLB debut as the starting catcher against the Chicago White Sox.

Rivero returned to Omaha in 2022, and was promoted to the major leagues on July 14.

On November 10, 2022, Rivero was designated for assignment and was placed on unconditional release waivers on November 16.

Chicago White Sox
On December 16, 2022, Rivero signed a minor league deal with the Chicago White Sox.

References

External links

1998 births
Living people
Sportspeople from Maracay
Major League Baseball players from Venezuela
Venezuelan expatriate baseball players in the United States
Major League Baseball catchers
Kansas City Royals players
Arizona League Royals players
Burlington Royals players
Lexington Legends players
Wilmington Blue Rocks players
Omaha Storm Chasers players
Dominican Summer League Royals players
Venezuelan expatriate baseball players in the Dominican Republic